The Federal University for Latin American Integration (UNILA) is a public university  located in the Brazilian city of Foz do Iguaçu, Paraná, at the tri-national border shared by Brazil, Argentina and Paraguay. UNILA emphasises natural resources, social studies and language, international relations and areas considered important for development and regional integration.

UNILA is a bilingual university, where Portuguese and Spanish are used.

History
Luiz Inácio da Silva, Brazil's former president, proposed the University creation in 2007, however it was created only on January 12, 2010 on the border between Brazil, Argentina and Paraguay.

UNILA was the thirteenth university inaugurated by the Lula Government, and had its first class of 200 students among Brazilians, Paraguayans, Uruguayans and Argentines in August 2010, with an estimated investment of approximately 550 million reais, a portentous construction expected to end in 2014, with the architectural design of the famous Brazilian architect Oscar Niemeyer.

It is connected to the network of federal universities in Brazil. Its mission is to contribute to Latin American integration, with emphasis on Mercosur, through technical cooperation among universities, government agencies and international.

Courses

Undergraduate 
 Biological Sciences
 Economic Sciences
 Social and Political Sciences
 Materials Engineering
 Energy Engineering
 Civil Engineering of Infrastructure
 International Relations and Integration
 Cinema and Audiovisual

Postgraduate
 Biosciences
 Neotropical Biodiversity
 Economics
 Civil Engineering
 Applied Physics
 History
 Contemporary Latin American Integration
 Latin American Studies
 Comparative Literature
 International Relations

See also 
 List of universities in Brazil
 Brazil University Rankings
 Universities and Higher Education in Brazil
 Universidade da Integração Internacional da Lusofonia Afro-Brasileira

References

External links 
  
 Projeto de lei que cria Universidade Federal da Integração Latino-Americana é assinado. Agência Brasil/Brazilian news agency (2007) (in Portuguese)
 University of Latin American Integration (UNILA) created. Embassy of Brazil in London, UK (2007).

Foz do Iguaçu
2010 establishments in Brazil
Educational institutions established in 2010
Universities and colleges in Paraná
Federal universities of Brazil